Eagle Pass may refer to:

United States

Mountain passes
 Eagle Pass (Coconino County, Arizona), Coconino County, Arizona
 Eagle Pass (Graham County, Arizona), Graham County, Arizona
 Eagle Pass (Maricopa County, Arizona), Maricopa County, Arizona
 Eagle Pass (San Bernardino County, California), San Bernardino County, California
 Eagle Pass (Tuolumne County, California), Tuolumne County, California
 Eagle Pass (Colorado), La Plata County, Colorado
 Eagle Pass (Idaho), Power County, Idaho
 Eagle Pass (Lake County, Montana)
 Eagle Pass (Nevada), Nye County, Nevada
 Eagle Pass (New York), Franklin County, New York
 Eagle Pass (Washington), Sawtooth Ridge
 Eagle Pass (Park County, Wyoming), Park County, Wyoming
 Eagle Pass (Washakie Range), Washakie Range, Wyoming

Communities
 Eagle Pass, Texas, a city and county seat

Canada
 Eagle Pass (British Columbia), a mountain pass through the Gold Range of the Monashee Mountains

See also